The Richmond City Council is the governing body of the city of Richmond, British Columbia, Canada. The council consists of the mayor and eight elected city councillors. Like Vancouver City Council, the councillors are not elected to represent wards like most Canadian cities.

Municipal elections are held every four years across the Province on the third Saturday of October.

List of Richmond Council

2022–present 

Elected in the 2022 municipal election

2021–2022

Elected in the 2018 municipal election and 2021 by-election

2018–2021

Elected in the 2018 municipal election

2014–2018

Elected in the 2014 municipal election

2011–2014

Elected in the 2011 municipal election

External links 
 Richmond City Council

Notes

References 

Municipal councils in British Columbia
Politics of Richmond, British Columbia